San Martín is a corregimiento in Panamá District, Panamá Province, Panama with a population of 4,410 as of 2010. Its population as of 1990 was 2,479; its population as of 2000 was 3,575.

References

Corregimientos of Panamá Province
Panamá District